Kauguri may refer to:

 Kauguri, Jūrmala, a part of Jūrmala city, Latvia
 Kauguri Parish, a village in Beverīna Municipality, Latvia